Parotis impia is a moth in the family Crambidae. It was described by Edward Meyrick in 1934. It is found in Mali, the Democratic Republic of the Congo (Equateur, East Kasai) and Zimbabwe.

References

Moths described in 1934
Spilomelinae